The Maserati V8RI was a model of racing car produced by Italian manufacturer Maserati of Modena in 1936, for total of four units.

Designed by Ernesto Maserati, they had a front-mounted 4.788-liter V8 engine, 90 degrees. The "RI" denoted Ruote indipendenti, the then innovative independent four-wheel suspension. The cars measurements were wheelbase , length , width , and height .

Chassis #4501 debuted at Grand Prix de la Marne 1935, driven by Philippe Étancelin. Its only victory was the Pau Grand Prix in 1936. All four V8RIs built competed in the 1937 Vanderbilt Cup at New York's Roosevelt Field, and all four remained in the United States for many years afterwards.

External links

maserati.org.au has a gallery and description
rickcarey.com on chassis #4501

References

V8RI
Grand Prix cars